is the seventeenth installment in the popular Kamen Rider Series of tokusatsu programs. It is a joint collaboration between Ishimori Productions and Toei. It premiered January 28, 2007 on TV Asahi, and concluded airing on January 20, 2008. Its lead actor Takeru Satoh is the first Kamen Rider Series lead born in the Heisei period of Japanese history. It aired on the Super Hero Time slot alongside Gogo Sentai Boukenger and later Juken Sentai Gekiranger.

Along with the usual film adaptation that Heisei Kamen Rider series have released during the late summer of their broadcast run, Den-O had a second film released in the spring following its broadcast run which grossed 730 million yen (approximately US$6.8 million) and a series of ten OVA shorts, both of which are firsts for any Kamen Rider. Continuing the trend, Kamen Rider Den-O also had a third film released in October 2008, the first for any Kamen Rider series and a second series of 12 OVA shorts was released in November 2008. Takeru Satoh claims that the reason that Den-O has amassed such popularity is because of its comedic timing. A fourth film was released on May 1, 2009, and three more released in the summer of 2010.

Synopsis

Ryotaro Nogami is a young man with a lot of bad luck. One day, he finds a strange pass and things got stranger from a mysterious girl and a large time-traveling train to being possessed by an entity called an Imagin, beings from an alternate future whose kind are attempting to change the past. Though slightly confused about the nature of the crisis, Ryotaro, along with the aid of the hot-headed, violent Imagin, dubbed Momotaros, becomes Kamen Rider Den-O, traveling to different times on the DenLiner to battle the evil Imagin to prevent them from altering the past to affect the present and future. During his adventure, Ryotaro is joined by other Imagin who aid him as well; the lying, manipulating, and womanizing Urataros, the herculean (and narcoleptic) Kintaros, and the childish yet powerful Ryutaros. He later meets the mysterious Yuto Sakurai and his bumbling Imagin partner Deneb. Yuto is not only Kamen Rider Zeronos but is the younger incarnation of Ryotaro's older sister Airi's fiancé, Sakurai, who mysteriously disappeared and is tied to the mysteries involving the Imagin and a person known as the Junction Point.

Imagin

 are creatures from the future who have come to the year 2007 in hopes of changing the past to alter the future that is their extinction. To reach this goal, Imagin grant the wishes of weak-hearted humans and then go back in time to that individual's most precious memory and begin to rampage there. When they lose control of their humanoid forms, Imagin grow into massive proportions known as Gigandeath.

Episodes

Films
A rarity for the Kamen Rider Series, Kamen Rider Den-O has had multiple theatrical releases, the most recent being a trilogy of films released on May 22, June 5, and June 19, 2010.

I'm Born!

 premiered on August 4, 2007. This is the second Heisei era film in the Kamen Rider Series to be a part of the storyline of its television series since Kamen Rider Agito. The film features scenes from the birthing of Kamen Rider Den-O, Zeronos, and Gaoh. Alongside I am Born!, the Juken Sentai Gekiranger movie Juken Sentai Gekiranger: Nei-Nei! Hō-Hō! Hong Kong Decisive Battle was shown as a double feature. A short animated feature called Momotaros's Summer Vacation was shown along with the films, as well. The event of the movie took place between episode 27 and 28.

Climax Cop

A movie titled  appeared in theaters on April 12, 2008. It features a meeting between the characters of Den-O and the characters of Kamen Rider Kiva. The animated short  was shown as a double feature. Climax Deka grossed 730 million yen in the box office and DVD sales.

Final Countdown

A third film adaptation of Kamen Rider Den-O titled  was released in Japanese theaters on October 4, 2008. The animated short  was shown as a double feature.

Cho-Den-O Series

Initially, a press release from Toei Company released on January 29, 2009, announced that there would be a fourth film for Kamen Rider Den-O. It was in production as of January 29, 2009, and was scheduled to be released in April 2009.

The Onigashima Warship

The first of the films in this series is titled , featuring the cast and characters of I'm Born!, Final Countdown, Kiva, and Kamen Rider Decade.

Cho-Den-O Trilogy

 is the name given to a series of three films released in a four-week period between May 22 and June 19, 2010. The films, Episode Red, Blue, and Yellow, each focus on a different Kamen Rider's story. Episode Red is Kamen Rider Zeronos's chapter, and Yuichi Nakamura reprised his role for the film. Episode Blue is Kamen Rider New Den-O's chapter, and Dori Sakurada reprised his role for the film. Episode Yellow is Kamen Rider Diend's chapter, and Kimito Totani reprised his role for the film.

Let's Go Kamen Riders

, released on April 1, 2011, commemorated the 40th anniversary of the Kamen Rider Series featuring the cast and characters of Kamen Rider Den-O, Kamen Rider OOO, and other characters from the past franchise series.

Super Hero Taisen

 is a film which features a crossover between the characters of the Kamen Rider and Super Sentai Series. The protagonists of Kamen Rider Decade and Kaizoku Sentai Gokaiger were featured, but the casts of Kamen Rider Fourze, Kamen Rider OOO, and Tokumei Sentai Go-Busters also participated.
Rina Akiyama and Kenjirō Ishimaru had reprised their roles as Naomi and Owner, along with the Tarōs (Toshihiko Seki, Kōji Yusa, Masaki Terasoma and Kenichi Suzumura).

Super Hero Taisen GP

 is the 2015 entry of the "Super Hero Taisen" film series, featuring the cast of Kamen Rider Drive and the appearance of Kamen Rider 3, which was originally created by Shotaro Ishinomori for the one-shot 1972 manga . Yuichi Nakamura reprised his role in the film, which opened in theaters on March 21, 2015, followed by the TV special sequel .

Ultra Super Hero Taisen
A crossover film, titled  featuring the casts of Kamen Rider Ex-Aid, Amazon Riders, Uchu Sentai Kyuranger, and Doubutsu Sentai Zyuohger, was released in Japan on March 25, 2017. This movie also celebrates the 10th anniversary of Kamen Rider Den-O and features the spaceship Andor Genesis from the Xevious game, which is used by the movie's main antagonists, as well as introduces the movie-exclusive Kamen Rider True Brave, played by Kamen Rider Brave's actor Toshiki Seto from Kamen Rider Ex-Aid, and the villain Shocker Great Leader III, played by the singer Diamond Yukai. In addition, individual actors from older Kamen Rider and Super Sentai TV series, Ryohei Odai (Kamen Rider Ryuki), Gaku Matsumoto (Shuriken Sentai Ninninger), Atsushi Maruyama (Zyuden Sentai Kyoryuger), and Hiroya Matsumoto (Tokumei Sentai Go-Busters) reprise their respective roles.

Heisei Generations Forever

A Movie War film, titled  was released on December 22, 2018, featuring the casts of Kamen Rider Build and Kamen Rider Zi-O along with Kamen Rider Den-O.

Production
The Kamen Rider Den-O trademark was registered by Toei on November 10, 2006.

Other visual media

Shin-chan special

Crayon Shin-chan aired a special episode on August 3, 2007, where Shin-chan meets Ryotaro, Hana, Naomi, the Owner, and Momotaros on the DenLiner. This special is titled .

In a later rerun of the special, Shin-chan and Nene meet up with Den-O, again, although to act as a teaser for the final episodes of Kamen Rider Den-O and to introduce Kamen Rider Kiva along with Ryotaro Nogami (Takeru Satoh) and Wataru Kurenai (Koji Seto). The live action Shin-chan also meets the cast of Juken Sentai Gekiranger for the teaser of their final episodes and later the cast of Engine Sentai Go-onger to air the trailer for their series.

The audio of Momotaros as Kamen Rider Den-O performing a finishing move is audible in the movie Jiro Dreams of Sushi.

Manga
It features a series of events involved with Hana's upcoming birthday and an evil Kamen Rider appearing with an army of Imagin at his disposal.

Hyper Battle DVD
Taking place between episodes 44 and 45,  is a series of exercises that Ryotaro Nogami, Kohana, Momotaros, Urataros, Kintaros, Ryutaros, Deneb, and Sieg join in to get Ryotaro into shape so he can fight. But when the additional help (the Spider Imagin, the Wolf Imagin, and Ari the Anthopper Imagin) go rogue, Ryotaro becomes Kamen Rider Den-O Liner Form to use his training against the evil Imagin.

Imagin Anime
Animate in conjunction with Ishimori Productions, TV Asahi, ADK, and Toei, have produced a series of OVA shorts for Den-O titled  featuring super deformed versions of the main Imagin that have been used in Animate's products for the series. A second set of animated shorts called  was released for sale on November 22, 2008, including cameos by the Wolf and the Ghost Imagin. A third set of animated shorts called  was to be released in December 2009, but has been pushed back to Spring 2010 and then again to October 21, 2010. This miniseries made more references to other Toei shows and included Ultraman Taro making a cameo appearance.

Shorts

Imagin Anime

Imagin Anime 2

Imagin Anime 3

Momotaros's King of the Castle in Burning Red
As a tie-in with Kamen Rider Kiva: King of the Castle in the Demon World, the Tarōs starred in a series of four short episodes called , where they get into another crazy adventure as they take the Ginjiro out for a spin. The first three episodes are one minute long, airing from July 20 to August 3 after Kamen Rider Kiva, depicting the Taros in reviewing the Go-onger and Kiva movies before Ryutaros is kidnapped by Kamen Rider Rey. The fourth two-minute-long episode shown in theaters after Kamen Rider Kiva: King of the Castle in the Demon World and Engine Sentai Go-onger: Boom Boom! Bang Bang! GekijōBang!!, featured Ryutaros found by Momotaros as reenactments of the two movies by the Taros are played on the movie screen. Toshihiko Seki reprised his role as the Imagin Momotaros and Kōji Yusa, Masaki Terasoma, and Kenichi Suzumura also reprised their roles as Urataros, Kintaros, and Ryutaros, respectively.

Mini episodes

April 3, 1971
The S.I.C. Hero Saga side story published in Monthly Hobby Japan magazine for Den-O is titled . Running from December 2008 to October 2009, the story expands upon the events of Climax Deka and Kamen Rider Nega Den-O's travel through time joining forces with the Great Leader of Shocker, with Den-O and Zeronos joining forces with the original Shōwa Kamen Riders to fight them.
Chapter titles

"DenLiner, Into Space!"
 is a planetarium show using the cast of Kiva and Den-O to teach children about the universe. It was shown at the Kagoshima Municipal Science Hall's planetarium between January 2 and March 30, 2009.

Novels
 , written by Shinichiro Shirakura, is part of a series of spin-off novel adaptions of the Heisei Era Kamen Riders. The novel was released on July 26, 2013.
 , written by Shinichiro Shirakura, is a spin-off novel. The novel was released on November 27, 2020.

Pretty Den-O Appears!
The storyline took place in 1989 during Kamen Rider Black RX.

Parodies
Kamen Rider Den-O has been parodied and referenced in recent episodes of various anime.
Urere is also voiced by Toshihiko Seki, who also provided the voice of Momotaros in Den-O. The phrase  is spoken by Giroro, as these are the lyrics of "Climax Jump", the opening theme song of Den-O. Keroro also re-enacts the opening sequence of Den-O on his .
 Episode 16 of  featured "guest" appearances of the DenGasher Sword, Rod, and Ax Modes as well as cameo appearances of the Owner, Momotaros, and Hana on a train very similar to the DenLiner Gouka.
 In episode 65 of Gintama, Okita uses Ryutaros' catchphrase  and his eyes flash purple while battling Kagura. Episode 89 of Gintama also features this visual gag. Kenichi Suzumura, who voices Ryutaros in Den-O, voices Okita in Gintama.

Cast
 : 
 : 
 : 
 , Opening Narration, : 
 : 
 : 
 : 
 : 
 : 
 : 
 :

Voice actors
For the portrayals of the Tarōs by Toshihiko Seki, Kōji Yusa, Masaki Terasoma, and Kenichi Suzumura, Kamen Rider Den-O was given the Synergy Award at the second Seiyu Awards.
 : 
 : 
 : 
 : 
 : 
 :

Guest actors

 : 
 : 
 : 
 : 
 : 
 : 
 : 
 : 
 : 
 : 
 : 
 : 
 : 
 :

Songs

The initial songs for the series, opening theme "Climax Jump" and ending theme "Double-Action", had multiple rearrangements to be used for other characters that were featured in the series. For all information on musical releases for Kamen Rider Den-O, see Kamen Rider Den-O discography.

Opening themes
 "Climax Jump"
 "Climax Jump DEN-LINER form"

Insert themes
 "Double-Action"
 "Double-Action Rod form"
 "Double-Action Ax form"
 "Double-Action Gun form"
 "Action-ZERO"
 "Real-Action"
 "Double-Action Wing form"
 "Climax Jump HIPHOP ver."
 "Double-Action Piano form (1-4)"
 "Double-Action Coffee form"
 "Climax Jump Dark HIPHOP ver."

Other songs
 
 "Double-Action GAOH form"
 "DEN-O VOCAL TRACKS LINER (C-J D-A nonstop re-connection)"
 "Action-ZERO Piano form"
 "Double-Action CLIMAX form"
 "Climax Jump the Final"
 
 "Action-ZERO 2010"
 "Double-Action Strike form"

References

External links
 
 
 

Den-O
2007 Japanese television series debuts
2008 Japanese television series endings
Japanese time travel television series
Television shows about spirit possession
Television shows based on fairy tales
Television shows set in Japan
Television shows written by Yasuko Kobayashi
Trains in fiction